Shao Zhanwei (February 1956 – March 6, 2013) was a Chinese politician from Cixi, Zhejiang. He was the Mayor of Hangzhou between 2010 and 2013, and the Mayor of Wenzhou between 2007 and 2010. He had a master's degree from Nanjing University of Science and Technology. He worked in Ningbo for most of his career, serving successively as the secretary-general of the city government, the head of administration at the Port of Ningbo, the executive vice mayor of Ningbo. He died in office in 2013, when he suffered a heart attack in Beijing while attending the 2013 National People's Congress.

References

Nanjing University of Science and Technology alumni
Politicians from Ningbo
1956 births
2013 deaths
People's Republic of China politicians from Zhejiang
Chinese Communist Party politicians from Zhejiang
Mayors of Hangzhou
People from Cixi